The Journal of the American Ceramic Society is a monthly peer-reviewed scientific journal published on behalf of the American Ceramic Society by Wiley-Blackwell. It was established in 1918 and is edited by John C. Mauro. Publishing formats include full length original research, communications (rapid publishing), feature articles, and review articles. The journal covers all aspects of research on ceramic materials science.

Abstracting and indexing
This journal is abstracted and indexed in:

According to the Journal Citation Reports, the journal has a 2021 impact factor of 4.186.

References

External links 
 

Materials science journals
English-language journals
Wiley-Blackwell academic journals
Publications established in 1918
Monthly journals
Academic journals associated with learned and professional societies of the United States
American Ceramic Society